Alga is a village in the Chüy District of Chüy Region of Kyrgyzstan. Its population was 979 in 2021.

References

Populated places in Chüy Region